Loud Pack may refer to:

 Loud Pack (album), of 2011 by Project Pat
 Loudpvck, the American DJ and electronic music producer